Aricco Jumitih is a Malaysian weightlifter. He won the gold medal at the 2010 Commonwealth Games in the Men's 62 kg event. He caused a minor controversy during the 2010 Games when he wore a jersey bearing the flag of his home state Sabah instead of the Malaysian national flag when competing for the event.

References

Year of birth missing (living people)
Living people
Malaysian male weightlifters
Place of birth missing (living people)
Commonwealth Games gold medallists for Malaysia
Commonwealth Games medallists in weightlifting
Weightlifters at the 2010 Commonwealth Games
20th-century Malaysian people
21st-century Malaysian people
Medallists at the 2010 Commonwealth Games